Jesuism or Jesusism is a belief system considering itself to be the true representation of the teachings of Jesus and contrasts itself from the teachings of mainstream Christianity. In particular, the term is often contrasted with Pauline Christianity and mainstream church dogma of Nicene Christianity.

Etymology 
The term Jesuism was coined by the late 1800s. It is derived from Jesus (Jesus of Nazareth) + -ism (English suffix, a characteristic or system of beliefs, from French -isme, Latin -ismus, Greek -ismos).

History of usage 

In 1878, freethinker and former Shaker D. M. Bennett wrote that "Jesuism", as distinct from "Paulism", was the gospel taught by Peter, John and James, and the Messianic doctrine of a new Jewish sect. In 1894, American pathologist and atheist Frank Seaver Billings defined "Jesusism" as the "Christianity of the Gospels" and a philosophy which "can be attributed directly to the teachings of Jesus the Nazarene". In 1909, the Seventh-day Adventist newspaper Signs of the Times, released an issue titled "Modern Christianity Not Jesusism", wherein the question is posed: "Christianity of today is not the old original Christianity. It is not Jesusism, for it is not the religion which Jesus preached. Is it not time to make Christianity the religion which He personally preached and which He personally practiced?" Harvard theologian Bouck White, in 1911, also defined "Jesusism" as "the religion which Jesus preached". Lord Ernest Hamilton in 1912 wrote that "Jesuism" was simply to love one another and love God. The philosophy of Jesusism was described in the book The Naked Truth of Jesusism from Oriental Manuscripts, penned by theologian Lyman Fairbanks George in 1914, as follows:

The Orthodox theologian Sergei Bulgakov further noted in 1935 that "the concentration of piety on the Christ alone has become a deviation already known by a special term as Jesusism". Influential Catholic theologian Karl Rahner referred to "Jesusism" as a focus on the life of Jesus and attempts to imitate his life, as opposed to a focus on God or the Christian Church. University of Melbourne professor Lindsay Falvey noted in 2009 that "the gospel story so differs from Church doctrine that it could well be of a different religion – Jesusism". Jesusism became the subject of increased academic discussion following its reference by Duke University neurobiologist and philosopher Owen Flanagan in his 2007 book The Really Hard Problem: Meaning in a Material World. Flanagan defines Jesusism as the "message" of Jesus and notes that he "call[s] it 'Jesusism' because most Christian Churches do not endorse Jesus' message truthfully". Flanagan characterized Jesuism as a naturalistic and rationalist philosophy, rejecting the conflict between faith and science. Rodney Stenning Edgecombe, a professor at the University of Cape Town, in a 2009 essay titled Commutation Across the Social Divide remarks how Christianity shifted away from Jesuism; the moral tenets Jesus preached. The terms Jesuism, Jesusism and Jesuanism are also referenced popularly on religious blogs and internet groups.

Beliefs, practices, and adherents
There is no definitive meaning of Jesuism and hence no clear ideology. Various groups use the terms Jesuism, Jesusism and Jesuanism. These include disenchanted Christians who are critical of institutional religion or Pauline Christianity, people who identify themselves as disciples of Jesus rather than Christians, and Christian atheists who accept some of Jesus' teachings but do not believe in God. Adherents may be termed Jesuists, Jesusists or Jesuans.

See also

 Bibliolatry
 Christian agnosticism
 Christian atheism
 Christian deism
 Historical Jesus
 Jefferson Bible
 Jesus movement
 Jesus Seminar
 Jewish Christian
 Ministry of Jesus
 New Monasticism
 Red-Letter Christians
 Sermon on the Mount
 The Aquarian Gospel of Jesus the Christ
 Tolstoyan movement

References 

Doctrines and teachings of Jesus
Christian terminology
Christian radicalism